= Hakim Ibragimov =

Azerbaijani sprinter (born 1990)

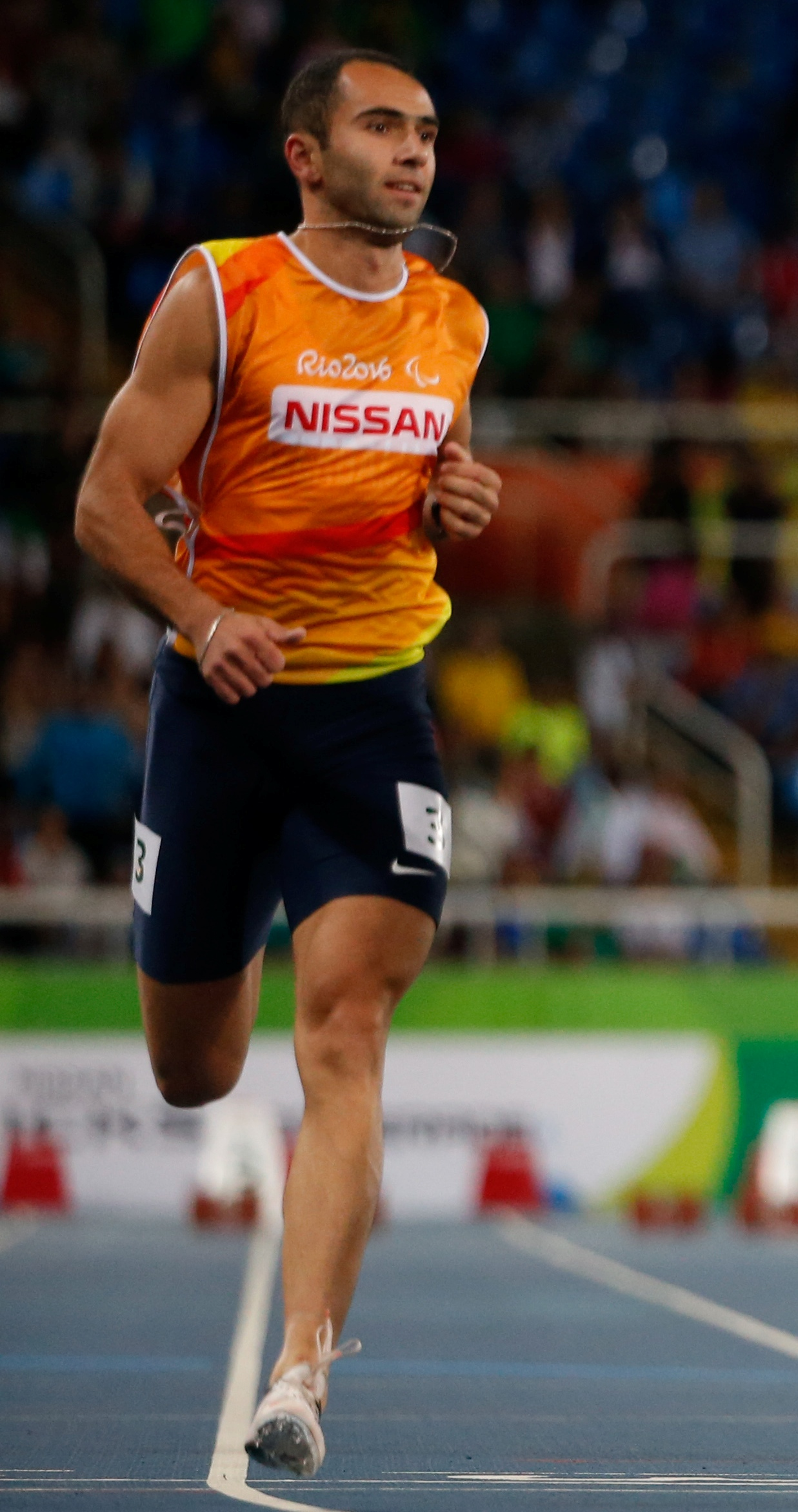

Personal information
- Nationality: Azerbaijan
- Citizenship: Azerbaijani
- Born: 2 October 1990 (age 35) Baku, Azerbaijan

Sport
- Sport: Athletics

Hakim Ibragimov (born 2 October 1990) is an Azerbaijani track and field athlete, member of the Azerbaijan national athletics team. He took part in the 2016 Summer Paralympics in Rio de Janeiro, where he was a guide for Elmir Dzhabrailova, Elchina Muradova and Elena Chebanu.

== Biography ==
Hakim Ibragimov was born on 2 October 1990, in Tashkent. At the age of 10, he moved to Baku with his parents.

When he was in school, a physical education teacher saw how he showed himself in class and advised him to take up athletics, recommending him to his mentor Vladimir Mikhailovich. Later, Ibragimov began studying with Javid Haspoladov.

He took part in international competitions in Georgia dedicated to Viktor Saneev, where he took 4th place. He participated in tournaments in Trabzon, Serbia, and Azerbaijan. At home, Hakim Ibragimov showed his best result in Yakut jumping competitions, after which he received the title of candidate master of sports in triple jumps. In Yakutia, Ibragimov was officially recognized as a master of sports in Yakut jumping.

In February 2010, Ibragimov became the winner of the triple jump competition of the international athletics tournament dedicated to the memory of the Honored Master of Sports Alexander Antipov, as well as the winner of the bronze medal in the long jump.

In 2012, he competed at the European Championships in Helsinki, where he showed a result of 47.47 seconds in the 400 meters and did not make it to the semifinals.

In January 2016, Ibragimov became the champion of Baku in the 800 meters, and at the international tournament in Ust-Kamenogorsk (Kazakhstan) he won the 800 meters (1:54.86), breaking the tournament record, and the bronze medalist in the 400 meters relay.

In the same year, he took part in the Paralympic Games in Rio de Janeiro as a guide for a number of athletes of the Azerbaijani national team. At the Games, he helped Elena Cheban win a silver medal in the 100 meters and a bronze in the 200 meters. In September 2016, Ibrahimov was awarded the Progress Medal by order of Azerbaijani President Ilham Aliyev for his high achievements at the XV Summer Paralympic Games in Rio de Janeiro, as well as for his services to the development of Azerbaijani sports.
